Hungarian nationalism developed in the late 18th century and early 19th century along the classic lines of scholarly interest leading to political nationalism and mass participation. In the 1790s, Hungarian nobles pushed for the adoption of Hungarian as the official language rather than Latin.

Parties

Current
Our Homeland Movement (2018–present)
Jobbik (2003–present)
Volner Party (2020-present)

Former
Hungarian Justice and Life Party (1993–2021) merged with Our Homeland Movement 
Party of the Hungarian Interest (1993–2005)
People of the Orient Party – Christian Democrats (1989–1998)
Arrow Cross Party (1935–1945)
Christian National Socialist Front (1937–1940)
United Hungarian National Socialist Party (1936–1940)
National Front (1936-1939)
Hungarian National Socialist Agricultural Labourers' and Workers' Party (1932–1945)
Hungarian National Independence Party (1923-1928)
Unity Party (1922–1944)

Movements
Force and Determination (2017–present)
Sixty-Four Counties Youth Movement (2001–present)
Pax Hungarica Movement (2008–2017)
Hungarian National Front (1989-2016)

See also
 Doctrine of the Holy Crown
 Hungarian irredentism
 Hungarian Revolution of 1848
 Hungarian Turanism
 Magyarization
 National symbols of Hungary
 National conservatism
 Right-wing populism
 Trianon Syndrome
 Related nationalisms 
 Austro-Hungarian Empire
 Austrian nationalism
 Bosniak nationalism
 Croatian nationalism
 German nationalism
 Slovak nationalism
 Slovenian nationalism
 Serbian nationalism

References

Further reading

External links
 Nationalism in Hungary, 1848-1867, Steven W. Sowards, Michigan State University

 
Nationalism